A battle for control of Rastan, a city of 60,000 residents in Homs Governorate, Syria, occurred from 27 September to 1 October 2011. In late September, there were reports of numerous Syrian Army defections in the area, following which the Free Syrian Army took control of Rastan. After a four-day battle, the city was retaken by the Syrian Army.

Background

On 28 May 2011, after major protests, the Syrian Army launched an operation in Rastan and the neighboring town of Talbiseh, which resulted in the suppression of anti-government protests and numerous deaths. The Syrian Army met some armed opposition during the operation, but had gained control of the city by 4 June.

Battle

In late September, there were reports of many Syrian Army defections in Rastan, and the Free Syrian Army claimed to have destroyed 17 armoured vehicles during clashes in the city, using RPGs and booby traps. The assault was also, the opposition claimed, supported by Syrian Air Force jets.

On 1 October, the Syrian Army took control of Rastan, killing 120 civilians and opposition soldiers according to opposition sources and arresting 3,000 suspected opposition members.

Aftermath

Insurgent activity continued in the area for months after the major clashes ended. On 24 November, the military conducted an operation in Rastan, during which they killed 16 gunmen and captured a large cache of weapons.

On 1 February 2012, the FSA and opposition activists reported that the FSA had gained full control of Rastan after four days of intense clashes. Photos were posted on the internet showing FSA fighters in the streets of Rastan, standing guard.

References

External links
We Live as in War, Human Rights Watch, 11 November 2011
By All Means Necessary!, Human Rights Watch, 16 December 2011

Military operations of the Syrian civil war in 2011
Homs Governorate in the Syrian civil war
Military operations of the Syrian civil war involving the Syrian government
Military operations of the Syrian civil war involving the Free Syrian Army
September 2011 events in Syria
October 2011 events in Syria
Battles of the Syrian civil war